Vani Ganapathy, also spelled as Vani Ganpati, is an Indian classical dancer.

Career
She started performing when she was seven, and has travelled across the world for her performances. She lives in Bangalore, where she set up Sanchari, a dance academy.

Film career
She started her acting career in Bollywood films in 1972.

Personal life
In 1978, Vani married actor Kamal Haasan.
 She acted with Haasan in the 1975 movie Melnaattu Marumagal. After they were married, Vani worked as Haasan's costume designer for several movies. They divorced ten years later in 1988.

Filmography

References

Bharatanatyam exponents
Living people
1956 births